East Point is a train station in East Point, Georgia, serving the Red and Gold lines of the Metropolitan Atlanta Rapid Transit Authority (MARTA) rail system. It has an island platform between two tracks. It was opened on August 16, 1986.

It mainly serves East Point, Camp Creek, and unincorporated South Fulton and College Park.

This station provides access to downtown East Point historic dining-shopping-urban renewal district, and East Point Public Library. Bus service is provided at this station to Atlanta Medical Center-South Campus, Brownsmill Golf Course, Point University, Fulton County Board of Education, Camp Creek Market Place, Fulton HJC Bowden Senior Center, Cleveland Avenue and Grady East Point Health Center. The proposed Clayton County commuter rail service will use it as the terminal, although it is on hold.

Station layout

Bus routes
The station is served by the following MARTA bus routes:
 Route 78 - Cleveland Avenue
 Route 79 - Sylvan Hills
 Route 81- Venetian Hills / Delowe Drive
 Route 84 - Washington Road / Camp Creek Marketplace
 Route 93 - Headland Drive / Main Street
 Route 181 - Washington Road / Fairburn
 Route 192 - Old Dixie / Tara Boulevard
 Route 193 - Morrow / Jonesboro

References

External links

MARTA Station Page
nycsubway.org Atlanta page
 Main Street entrance from Google Maps Street View
 Dorsey Avenue entrance from Google Maps Street View

Gold Line (MARTA)
Red Line (MARTA)
Metropolitan Atlanta Rapid Transit Authority stations
Railway stations in the United States opened in 1986
Railway stations in Fulton County, Georgia
1986 establishments in Georgia (U.S. state)
East Point, Georgia